Tyttocharax is a genus of characins found in tropical South America.

Species
There are currently 4 recognized species in this genus:
 Tyttocharax cochui (Ladiges, 1949)
 Tyttocharax madeirae Fowler, 1913 (Black-edge tetra)
 Tyttocharax metae Román-Valencia, García-Alzate, Ruiz-C. & Taphorn, 2012 
 Tyttocharax tambopatensis S. H. Weitzman & H. Ortega, 1995

References

Characidae
Fish of South America